The SL-68 II is a Nelson valve based pump action paintball marker manufactured by Tippmann.

the marker was manufactured from 1991 to 2003. The marker was still available to the public through many mail-order paintball stores, including the manufacturer, until the early 2000s, well after the advent of the Tippmann 98 Custom. The body is made of die cast aluminum alloy; other notable features include: a built in air source adapter (located at the bottom of the pistol grip) and a quick cleaning hole for squeegee access during a game. Its previous iteration, the SL-68 I, was a similar marker with only a few minute differences.

In 2009 the SL-68 II was briefly reintroduced, before being discontinued again in 2012

Paintball markers